The 2012–13 Belmont Bruins men's basketball team represented Belmont University during the 2012–13 NCAA Division I men's basketball season. The Bruins, led by 27th-year head coach Rick Byrd, played their home games at the Curb Event Center and were first year members of the Ohio Valley Conference in the East Division. They finished the season 26–7, 14–2 in OVC play to be champions of the West Division. They were also champions of the OVC tournament, winning the championship game in overtime over Murray State, to earn their third consecutive trip to the NCAA tournament where they lost in the second round to Arizona.

Roster

Schedule

|-
!colspan=9| Regular season

|-
!colspan=9| 2013 OVC Basketball tournament

|-
!colspan=9| 2013 NCAA tournament

References

Belmont Bruins men's basketball seasons
Belmont
Belmont